Salman Al-Dosari  is a Saudi football defender who played for Saudi Arabia in the 1984 Asian Cup.

References
Stats

1963 births
Living people
Saudi Arabian footballers
Olympic footballers of Saudi Arabia
Footballers at the 1984 Summer Olympics
1984 AFC Asian Cup players
Saudi Professional League players
AFC Asian Cup-winning players
Association football defenders
Saudi Arabia international footballers